The 2022–23 Rice Owls men's basketball team represents Rice University during the 2022–23 NCAA Division I men's basketball season. The team is led by sixth-year head coach Scott Pera, and plays their home games at Tudor Fieldhouse in Houston, Texas as members of Conference USA.

This is the last season for the team as members of Conference USA before joining the American Athletic Conference on July 1, 2023.

Previous season
The Owls finished the 2021–22 season 16–17, 7–11 in C-USA play to finish in fifth place in West Division. They defeated Charlotte in second round of the C-USA Tournament before losing to North Texas in the quarterfinals. They were invited to the CBI post-season tournament where they lost to Ohio in the first round.

Offseason

Departures

Incoming transfers

Recruiting classes

2022 recruiting class

2023 recruiting class

Roster

Schedule and results

|-
!colspan=12 style=| Exhibition

|-
!colspan=12 style=|Regular season

|-
!colspan=12 style=| Conference USA tournament

|-
!colspan=12 style=| College Basketball Invitational

Source

See also
 2022–23 Rice Owls women's basketball team

References

Rice Owls men's basketball seasons
Rice
Rice
Rice men's basketball
Rice men's basketball